Tony Fiore may refer to:
Tony Fiore (born 1962), ice hockey player
Tony Fiore (born 1971), baseball player